{{Infobox person
| name               = David Matranga
| image              = David Matranga 2020.jpg
| caption            = Matranga at GalaxyCon Richmond in 2020
| birth_name         = 
| birth_date         = 
| birth_place        = 
| occupation         = Voice actor 
| years_active       = 1999–present
| agent              = Pastorini-Bosby Talent
| notable_works      = {{Plainlist|
My Hero Academia as Shoto Todoroki
Attack on Titan as Bertholdt Hoover
Clannad as Tomoya Okazaki
Akame ga Kill! as Wave
Fairy Tail as God Serena
Hitorijime My Hero as Kousuke Oshiba}}
}}David Matranga is an American voice actor who works primarily for English dubbed anime for Funimation, Sentai Filmworks, and Bang Zoom! Entertainment. Matranga is best known as the voice of Shoto Todoroki from My Hero Academia, Hideki Hinata from Angel Beats, Genjo Sanzo from Saiyuki, Orphen from Sorcerous Stabber Orphen, Bertholdt Hoover from the popular Attack on Titan series, Tomoya Okazaki from the emotional Clannad series, Takumi Usui from Maid Sama, Ghost from the Halo Legends movie, Briareos from the Appleseed series, Yu Himura from the EF series, God Serena from Fairy Tail, and most recently, Ken Masters in Street Fighter 6.

Dubbing roles
Anime
2000
 Generator Gawl – Security Guard 1, Spider Generator
2001
 Orphen – Orphen
2002
 Chance Pop Session – Kaito Kosaka, Keiji, Additional Voices
 Steel Angel Kurumi – Kamihito Kasuga
2003
 Colorful – Hirokawa, Jamie
 Dirty Pair: Project Eden – Carson D. Carson (ADV dub)
 Martian Successor Nadesico: The Motion Picture – Prince of Darkness – Yamasaki
 Saiyuki – Genjo Sanzo
 Orphen 2: Revenge – Orphen
 The Samurai  – Takeshi Chimatsuri 
 The Super Milk-chan Show – Robodog, Ario the Baby Ant, Himself (Live-Action Scenes)
2005
 Elfen Lied – Ohmori (Ep. 10), Mail Staff (Ep. 11), Police Officer B (Ep. 9)
 Gilgamesh – Decem
2006
 Nanaka 6/17 – Onigiri
2007
 Devil May Cry: The Animated Series – Issac (Ep. 5)
 Le Chevalier D'Eon – d'Eon de Beaumont
2008
 5 Centimeters Per Second – Takaki Tono (ADV dub)
 Appleseed: Ex Machina – Briareos
2009
 Canaan – Minorikawa
2010
 Angel Beats! – Hinata Hideki
 Canaan – Minorikawa
 Clannad – Tomoya Okazaki
 Halo Legends - Ghost (Prototype), Joseph (Homecoming)
 Legends of the Dark King – Souga
 Xam'd Lost Memories – Furuichi 
2011
 Demon King Daimao – Yozo Hattori
 Guin Saga – Istavan
 Highschool of the Dead – Hisashi Igo, Additional Voices
 Loups=Garous – Touji Kunugi
 Mardock Scramble – Dr. Easter
 Samurai Girls – Muneakira Yagyu (as Ben Wabal)
2012
 The Book of Bantorra – Mokkania
 Broken Blade – Loggin G. Garf Ensance, Loquis
 Children Who Chase Lost Voices – Ryuji Morisaki
 Dream Eater Merry – Pharos Hercules
 Ef: A Fairy Tale of the Two – Yu Himura
 Hakuōki – Keisuke Yamanami
 Heaven's Memo Pad – Hiroaki 'Hiro' Kuwabara
 Intrigue in the Bakumatsu – Irohanihoheto – Kozo Shirauni
 Majikoi! – Oh! Samurai Girls – Kuroko Haguro, Ryuhei Itagaki
 Needless – Adam Arclight
 Penguindrum – Kenzen Takakura, Sahei Nasume, Yosuke Yamashita
 Starship Troopers: Invasion – Johnny Rico
 Towa no Quon – Cyborg Epsilon/Shun Kazami
 Un-Go – Makiro Serada (Ep. 0)
2013
 Another – Shoji Kubodera
 Appleseed XIII – Briareos
 Btooom! – Masahito Date
 Colorful: The Movie – Mr. Sawada
 Fairy Tail the Movie: Phoenix Priestess – Geese
 The Garden of Words – Mr. Ito
 Gatchaman – Alan (Sentai Dub, Ep. 2), Count Los Mandos (Sentai Dub, Ep. 2)
 Girls und Panzer – Shinzaburou
 Hiiro no Kakera – Yuichi Komura
 Horizon in the Middle of Nowhere II – Innocentuis, Nenji, Noriki
 Inu x Boku SS – Kagerou Shoukiin
 Kids on the Slope – Junichi Katsuragi
 Kokoro Connect – Ryuzuen Goto/Heartseed
 Medaka Box – Umumichi Yakushima, Hakama Shiranui
 Momo: The Girl God of Death – Matsumoto (Ep. 6)
 Nyan Koi! – Kouta Kawamura
 One Piece – Puzzle, Shu (Funimation dub)
 Rurouni Kenshin – New Kyoto Arc – Choju Sawagejo, Usui Uonuma, Soldier Bob
 Say "I Love You". – Daichi Kurosawa, Yamoto's Big Brother
 S•A: Special A – Aoi Ogata, Nakamura, Sakura's Dad
 Starship Troopers: Invasion – Johnny Rico
 Tokyo Magnitude 8.0 – Seiji Onozawa
 Wolf Children – The Wolfman
 Space Pirate Captain Harlock – Captain Harlock
 This Boy Caught a Merman – Isaki
2014
 AKB0048 next stage – Chieri's Father
 Appleseed Alpha – Briareos
 Attack on Titan – Bertholdt Hoover
 Code:Breaker – Hitomi
 From the New World – Shisei Kaburagi
 Hakkenden: Eight Dogs of the East – Rio Satomi
 Karneval – Akari
 Log Horizon – Rodrick
 Majestic Prince – Prince Jiart
 Psycho-Pass – Koichi Ashikaga (Ep. 8)
 Red Data Girl – Yukimasa Sagara
 Sunday Without God – Julie Sakuma Dmitriyevich
 Tamako Market – Kunio Yaobi
 No Matter How I Look at It, It's You Guys' Fault I'm Not Popular! – Tomoki Kuroki
 Diabolik Lovers – Richter
2015
 Haikyuu!! – Yutaro Kindaichi
 Akame ga Kill! – Wave
 Attack on Titan: Junior High – Bertholdt Hoover
 Ghost in the Shell: The New Movie – Osamu Fujimoto
 Magical Warfare – Kazuma Ryuusenji
 Muv-Luv Alternative: Total Eclipse – Jerzy Sandek
 Maid Sama! – Takumi Usui
 Dramatical Murder – Koujaku
2016
 Brothers Conflict – Subaru Asahina
 Hetalia: The World Twinkle – Hutt River, Pope Clement VII
 Joker Game – Odagiri
 My Hero Academia – Shoto Todoroki
 My Love Story!! – Koki Ichinose 
 Parasyte -the maxim- – Mita
 Planetarian: The Reverie of a Little Planet – The Junker
 Tokyo ESP – Toru Kanze
2017
 Classroom of the Elite – Manabu Horikita
 Kuroko's Basketball – Nash Gold Jr.
2018

 Battlerite – Zander
 Death March to the Parallel World Rhapsody – Jon Belton
 Hitorijime My Hero – Kousuke Ohshiba
 High School DxD Hero – Belzard
2019
 Boogiepop and Others – Echoes
 Cop Craft – Kei Matoba
 Dragon Ball Super: Broly – Male Saiyan B, Male Saiyan Guard B, Male Frieza Crew A, Male Saiyan General A
 Fairy Tail – God Serena
 A Certain Magical Index III - Knight Leader
2020 
 Plunderer – Jail Murdoch
 Arte - Matei
 The Millionaire Detective Balance: Unlimited – Teppei Yumoto 
 Shirobako – Sugesuke Enjō
 Sorcerous Stabber Orphen – Orphen
 Toilet-Bound Hanako-kun – Minamoto Teru
2021
 Full Dive – Shouhei Aida
 Gleipnir – Kaito
 SSSS.Dynazenon – Onija
 The Prince of Tennis II: Hyotei vs. Rikkai Game of Future – Wakashi Hiyoshi
 The Saint's Magic Power is Omnipotent – Johan Valdec
 Moriarty the Patriot – George Lestrade
 Sonny Boy – Hayato
 Re-Main – Shūgo Amihama
 2.43: Seiin High School Boys Volleyball Team – Yūhi Sawatari
 Mieruko-chan – Zen Toono
 JoJo's Bizarre Adventure: Stone Ocean - Jonhgalli A2022 Tomodachi Game – Yuichi
 One Piece – Charlotte Cracker
 Smile of the Arsnotoria the Animation – Zwingli
 Blue Lock – Ikki
 Spy × Family –  Daybreak2023' Buddy Daddies – Rei
 Trigun Stampede – Nicholas D. Wolfwood

Video Games
2020Fire Emblem Heroes – KnollMy Hero One's Justice 2 – Shoto Todoroki

2022Live A Live – Pike, Pancho, Captain Square

2023Fire Emblem Engage – ZelkovStreet Fighter 6 – Ken Masters

Filmography
Television
 Law & Order'' – Peter Griggs (Episode: Murder Book)

Awards and nominations

References

External links

David Matranga at CrystalAcids Anime Voice Actor Database

Living people
American male video game actors
American male voice actors
20th-century American male actors
21st-century American male actors
Year of birth missing (living people)